Phytoecia iraniensis is a species of beetle in the family Cerambycidae. It was described by Stephan von Breuning and Villiers in 1972. It is known from Iran.

References

Phytoecia
Beetles described in 1972